Helmholtzia glaberrima, commonly referred to as stream lily, is a rhizomatous perennial plant which is native to New South Wales and Queensland in Australia.

Stream lilies have long, dark-green strap-like leaves and form clumps that are up to 2 metres high. The tall flower spikes, which appear in the summer, are white or pale pink.

They occur in and the McPherson Range and nearby areas of rainforest along creeks and gullies.

The species was first formally described by English botanist Joseph Dalton Hooker in The Botanical Magazine in 1873. He gave it the name Philydrum glaberrimum. The species was transferred to the genus Helmholtzia in 1881.

References

 
PlantNET: Flora of New South Wales: Helmholtzia glaberrima

Commelinales of Australia
Flora of New South Wales
Flora of Queensland
Rare flora of Australia
Philydraceae